Culver Field is a former Baseball ground located in Rochester, New York. Located at the northwest corner of University Avenue and Culver Road, Culver Field was home of the Rochester Broncos from 1886 until it burned down on October 8, 1893. [Rochester Democrat and Chronicle, October 9, 1893, p.10] 

Re-built for the 1898 season, the new Culver Field played host to the newly named Rochester Beau Brummels for a decade. However, the right field bleachers collapsed May 19, 1906, leading to dozens of injuries and lawsuits. [Rochester Democrat and Chronicle, May 20, 1906, p.21] After the 1907 season, the ballpark was acquired by Gleason Works, which turned the site into the plant that stands to this day.

Late in the 1898 season, three neutral-site games were played in Rochester, between the Brooklyn Dodgers and Cleveland Spiders of the National League. The games of August 27 and 29 were played at Culver Field. The game of the 28th (a Sunday) was played at the Ontario Beach Grounds in the Charlotte section of the city.

References

External links
Newspaper article about opening day, 1886
Newspaper illustration of the ballpark from opening day, 1886
1900 map showing Culver Field
1906 stands collapse

Sports venues in Rochester, New York
Defunct baseball venues in the United States
Defunct sports venues in New York (state)
Baseball venues in New York (state)